Hans-Georg Panczak (born 19 July 1952 in Düsseldorf, Germany) is a German television actor and voice actor. He is best known as the German voice of Waylon Smithers in The Simpsons, of Mark Hamill in the original Star Wars trilogy, and of Glenn Quagmire in Family Guy since the fourth season.

Selected filmography
 Derrick - Season 2, Episode 10: "Kamillas junger Freund" (1975)
 Derrick - Season 5, Episode 4: "Ein Hinterhalt" (1978)
 Derrick - Season 9, Episode 2: "Eine Falle für Derrick" (1982)
 Derrick - Season 12, Episode 4: "Toter Goldfisch" (1985)

External links
 

1952 births
Living people
German male television actors
German male voice actors
Actors from Düsseldorf